The knockout stage of the 2011 Rugby World Cup began on 8 October with a quarter-final between Ireland and Wales and concluded on 23 October with the final at Eden Park in Auckland.

New Zealand were the first team to qualify for the knockout stage, when they beat France 37–17 in their penultimate Pool A game. New Zealand and France re-encountered in the final, that was won by the local team 8–7. This was a rematch of the 1987 final, also in Eden Park and also won by New Zealand. This way, New Zealand got their second title, while France their third final.

For the first time in World Cup history, three teams that finished second in their respective pools qualified for the semi-finals, while South Africa became the second defending champions not to reach the semi-finals after Australia in 1995.

Furthermore, the bottom half of the bracket was entirely composed of the 2012 Rugby Championship teams and the other half was composed of the last four Six Nations champions since the last World Cup.

Bracket

Quarter-finals

Ireland vs Wales

England vs France

South Africa vs Australia

New Zealand vs Argentina

Notes
This was New Zealand fullback Mils Muliaina's 100th test, the second New Zealand player to have reached this milestone.

Semi-finals

Wales vs France

Notes
The Welsh captain was sent off after committing a tip-tackle, releasing the opponent past the horizontal off the ground in the 18th minute.

Australia vs New Zealand

Bronze final

Wales vs Australia

Notes
This was Australian lock Nathan Sharpe's 100th test, the fifth Australian to reach the milestone.

Final

France vs New Zealand

References

knockout stage
2010–11 in Welsh rugby union
2010–11 in Irish rugby union
2010–11 in French rugby union
2010–11 in English rugby union
2011 in South African rugby union
2011 in Australian rugby union
2011 in Argentine rugby union
knockout